C&NLMAN (Cumbria And North Lancashire Metropolitan Area Network) is one of the regional networks that comprise Janet. C&NLMAN connects universities and colleges in Cumbria and Lancashire in the north-west of England to each other and to the Janet backbone.

External links
 https://web.archive.org/web/20060813095123/http://www.canlman.net.uk/
 Janet

Regional academic computer networks in the United Kingdom